St Teresa's Effingham is a selective, independent boarding and day school for girls aged 2–18 in Effingham, Surrey, England, established in 1928. It is a member of the Girls' Schools Association.

History
In 1799, John Fuller built a mansion called Effingham Hill House on the site of another house which had been called Tibs, and this house now forms the centre of the senior school, and has been extended to provide modern facilities. In 1886 or somewhat later, Julius Caesar Czarnikow bought Effingham Hill House from Frederick Augustus Maxse, and owned it until he died in 1909. His daughter, Ada Louisa, sold it to Azalea Caroline Keyes, who in 1916 sold it to Robert Reitmeyer Calburn, who owned it until 1928. St Teresa's was founded in that house by the Religious Order of Christian Instruction (who also founded St Teresa's sister school Leweston School) in 1928 on what was originally part of a manor site recorded in the Domesday Book. The last headmistress nun retired in 1977. Since 2002, the school has been managed by a lay trust. Although there are no longer any religious sisters on staff (as of 2013-14 academic year), the school maintains its Catholic ethos and ties to the local parish, which is represented in the school's Board of Governors.

An all-weather pitch and new swimming pool complex were completed in 2000 and 2003 respectively and, in September 2005, music, drama and the arts benefited from a multimillion-pound, 750-seat technologically equipped performing arts theatre hall, with new music and drama suites.

Curriculum
St Teresa’s Prep School is a model teaching school, being studied as a resource for Kingston University for studies such as enhancing literacy and positive social interaction in the classroom.  Through an extensive programme of professional development for staff, teachers are fully informed of cutting edge methodologies for full engagement and interaction.  A Microsoft IT Academy accredited school, the school therefore teaches computer usage, as well as basic computer programming, from an early age to ensure that IT skills are so well known as to be routinely applied. Computer Programming is offered as an extra-curricular option in Years 4 and 5, and as part of the extended curriculum for Year 6 girls since 2013.  The school's head announced a planned departure and a new head was recruited in September 2012, Mr M. Farmer.

Location
St Teresa's has  of grounds in a designated area of outstanding natural beauty amid the Surrey Hills AONB, in a multi-crested section of the escarpment of the North Downs. In 1953 a separate preparatory school was established at Grove House, in the village centre of Effingham about a mile away and has since relocated to the main school site.

Admissions
Entry to St. Teresa's is selective, and is based on an entrance examination with papers in English, Maths, Science and Verbal Reasoning.  This does not preclude many students with special educational needs, who receive support in the school to help them through their studies, social interaction and exams.

Cranmore School partnership
In May 2019, a prep school for boys, Cranmore, West Horsley, joined St Teresa's in the Effingham Schools Trust. The Trust plans to expand Cranmore into providing secondary education on its present site, with the two schools having a combined sixth form located at St Teresa's, from September 2025.

Notable former pupils

Past pupils are known as STOGs (St Teresa's Old Girls)
 Lynne Reid Banks, former actress and author
 Lara Goodison, actress and Shipwrecked: Battle of the Islands 2008 contestant
 Ranjini Haridas, actress, model and Miss Kerala 2000 winner
 Natalie Coyle, classically trained soprano

House System
The students are allocated to four houses which are named after saints:
St. Benedict
St. Dominic
St. Ignatius
St. Francis

References

External links
St Teresa's School Official Site
Profile on MyDaughter
GCSE League Table
ISI Inspection Reports - Prep School & Senior School

Private schools in Surrey
Catholic boarding schools in England
Girls' schools in Surrey
Member schools of the Girls' Schools Association
Roman Catholic private schools in the Diocese of Arundel and Brighton
Boarding schools in Surrey
Educational institutions established in 1928
School buildings completed in 1799
1928 establishments in England
Diamond schools